is an electoral district of the House of Councillors in the National Diet (national legislature of Japan). The district was created in 1947 by the new Constitution of Japan and sent 8 members to the House from 1947 until 2007. From 2007 until 2016, this district sent 10 members to the House, and from 2016 onwards, the district has sent 12 councillors to the House, making it by-far the largest constituency in the House of Councillors

Elected Councillors

Election Results 
Notes:
 Decimals from anbunhyō ("fractional proportional votes" that stem from ambiguous votes, e.g. from ballots reading just "Suzuki") omitted in the 2016, 2013 and 2007 results
 (2016 only) (*): ineligible as runner-up replacement (kuriage-tōsen), lost deposit

Elections in the 2020s

Elections in the 2010s

Elections in the 2000s

Elections in the 1990s

Elections in the 1980s

Elections in the 1970s

Elections in the 1960s

Elections in the 1950s

Elections in the 1940s

References 

Districts of the House of Councillors (Japan)
Politics of Tokyo